John Archibald may refer to:

 Jock Archibald (1895–1967) Scottish football goalkeeper
 John Archibald (cricketer) (born 1958), Antiguan cricketer
 John Archibald (cyclist) (born 1990), Scottish racing cyclist
 John Archibald (politician) (1845–1907), politician in Queensland, Australia
 John Archibald (priest) (1840–1915), Anglican priest and author
 John Archibald (writer), winner of the 2018 Pulitzer Prize in commentary
 J. F. Archibald (John Feltham Archibald, 1856–1919), Australian journalist and publisher
 John Smith Archibald (1872–1934), Canadian architect

See also
 John Archibald Venn (1883–1958), British economist